The men's 1500 metres at the 2002 European Athletics Championships were held at the Olympic Stadium on August 6–8.

Medalists

Results

Heats
Qualification: First 4 of each heat (Q) and the next 3 fastest (q) qualified for the final.

Final

External links

1500
1500 metres at the European Athletics Championships